Clematis integrifolia is a flowering vine of the genus Clematis. Like many members of that genus, it is prized by gardeners for its showy flowers. 
C. integrifolia bears nodding, urn-shaped blue flowers in summer that are 1.5 inches wide. It is a fairly short variety, growing only to 3 feet high. It is native to Europe and Asia. In the USA it grows best in American Horticultural Society zones 8 to 1.

Several popular hybrids have been made by crossing C. integrifolia with other Clematis varieties. C. 'Hendersonii' is a cross with C. viticella, and C. 'Durandii' is a cross with C. x jackmanii.

References

integrifolia
Flora of Asia
Flora of Europe
Flora of China
Plants described in 1753
Taxa named by Carl Linnaeus